The Beauce-Etchemin School Board (la Commission scolaire de la Beauce-Etchemin) has its headquarters in Saint-Georges, Quebec. The last Director-General of the School Board was Camil Turmel as of June 26, 2006.

Administration 
It covers fifty-five municipalities and is divided into seven sectors;
Sector des Abénaquis
Sector des Appalaches
Sector Bélanger
Sector Benoît-Vachon
Sector Saint-François
Sector Sartigan
Sector Veilleux

The slogan of the School Board in French is "Ensemble vers l'avenir" which translates as "Together towards the future".  The slogan means that education is the foundation upon which we can build upon towards a better and brighter future for all generations.

External links 
 La Commission scolaire de la Beauce-Etchemin

Saint-Georges, Quebec
Historical school districts in Quebec
Education in Chaudière-Appalaches